Wenanita Angang (born 8 May 1996) is a Malaysian data scientist, advocate of hippotherapy for autistic children, model and beauty queen who was crowned Miss World Malaysia 2022.

She was previously crowned as Miss Planet Malaysia in 2016 and Unduk Ngadau Kuala Penyu in 2018. As she win the title of Miss World Malaysia, she owns the right to represent her country at the 71st edition of Miss World pageant.

Pageantry

Miss Sabah Model of the Year 2016 
In 2016, she participated in Miss Sabah Model of the Year pageant where she won the eventual title competed against 13 other finalists. The contest was held at Shangri-La's Tanjung Aru Resort and Spa on 4 June 2016. The contest was established in 2011 for Sabahan women to showcase their talent in modelling as well as pageantry.

Miss Planet International 2016 
Also at the age of 20, she won Miss Planet Malaysia pageant. At Miss Planet International 2016 pageant she placed second and received Best in National Costume subsidiary award.

Unduk Ngadau 2018 
In May 2018, she won the Unduk Ngadau Kuala Penyu pageant where she succeeded the outgoing titleholder, Suzziereen Guan. Inanam representative, Hosiani James Jaimis won the said pageant.

Miss World Malaysia 2022 
On 27 August 2022, she competed against 14 other contestants, winning Miss World Malaysia 2022. She succeeded her predecessor, Dr. Lavanya Sivaji from Selangor. She became the fifth titleholder from her state to win the title of Miss World Malaysia within the period of seven years, following the recent victory of Brynn Zalina Lovett in 2015.

In the final question and answer portion, she were asked by the host, "what is the most inconvenient truth about climate change?" and she replied:During the pageant, she was in the top 8 for the Beauty with a Purpose award. Runners-up were Evelyn Ting of Sarawak and Anya Kimberly Kow, also from Sabah. She will represent Malaysia at Miss World 2023.

References

External links 

 
 

1996 births
Living people
Miss World 2022 delegates
People from Sabah
Malaysian female models
Malaysian beauty pageant winners